Lublin District was one of the first four Nazi districts of the General Governorate region of German-occupied Poland during World War II, along with Warsaw District, Radom District, and Kraków District. On the south and east, it initially bordered the Soviet Union. After Operation Barbarossa, it bordered Reichskommissariat Ukraine to the east and Galizien District to the south, which was also part of the General Governorate.

References

General Government
History of Lublin Voivodeship